Nikolai von Koslowski (born 3 February 1958 in Esslingen) is a German journalist and award-winning director of radio plays like Die Stammheim Bänder in 2009 and the prestigious Deutschen Hörbuchpreis.

Life and work 
He moved to Berlin in 1988 and worked for Sender Freies Berlin (SFB) with Peter Leonhard Braun. During his studies at LMU München he worked with Bayerischen Rundfunks and „Zündfunk“.

Award winning radio plays (selection) 

2002: Nicht schuldig. Kriegsverbrecher aus dem ehemaligen Jugoslawien vor dem Internationalen Gerichtshof in Den Haag von Slavenka Drakulic, SFB/ORB. Geisendörfer-Preis
2003: Ist das Ihr Fahrrad, Mr. O'Brien? – Eine Hörspielcollage aus der Welt der Wissenschaft und des Suffs von Albrecht Behmel; Hörspiel des Monats September 2003, Hörspiel des Monats der Deutschen Akademie der Darstellenden Künste.
2005: Vergitterte Welt. Katrin L.: Die Geschichte einer Magersucht von Helga Dierichs, NDR. Geisendörfer-Preis
2007: Der konkrete Schrecken des Krieges. Die Bundeswehr und der Tod von Udo Zindel, MDR. Geisendörfer-Preis
2008: La Sehnsucht. Franzosen in Berlin von Clarisse Cossais, SWR. Deutsch-Französischer Journalistenpreis 2009
2009: Die Stammheim-Bänder von Maximilian Schönherr, WDR. Deutscher Hörbuchpreis
2009: Koma-Kicks. Erkundungen unter jungen Kampftrinkern von Tom Schimmeck. Preis Bremer Hörkino und Deutscher Sozialpreis
2010: Bonga Boys. Global Village Stories'' von Martina Schulte, WDR. Deutscher Radiopreis

References

German journalists
German male journalists
1958 births
Living people
German male writers